Hydrochorea is a genus of flowering plants in the family Fabaceae. It belongs to the mimosoid clade of the subfamily Caesalpinioideae. It contains a mere 3 species at present:

 Hydrochorea corymbosa (Rich.) Barneby & J.W.Grimes
 Hydrochorea gonggrijpii (Kleinhoonte) Barneby & J.W.Grimes
 Hydrochorea marginata (Benth.) Barneby & J.W.Grimes

Hydrochorea acreana is provisionally placed in Abarema, as Abarema acreana.

Footnotes

References
  (2005): Genus Hydrochorea. Version 10.01, November 2005. Retrieved 2008-MAR-31.

Mimosoids
Fabaceae genera
Taxa named by James Walter Grimes
Taxa named by Rupert Charles Barneby
Taxonomy articles created by Polbot